This article lists some but by no means all of the oldest known church buildings in the world. In most instances, buildings listed here were reconstructed numerous times and only fragments of the original buildings have survived. These surviving freestanding buildings were purposely constructed for use by congregations (or used at an early date). The dates are the approximate dates when they were first used by congregations for worship.

The term church may be used in the sense of "Christian denomination" or in the singular as the Christian Church as a whole. The "church" (Greek , 'assembly') is traced to Pentecost and the beginning of the Christian mission in the first century and was not used in reference to a building.

According to the Catholic Encyclopedia the Cenacle (the site of the Last Supper) in Jerusalem was the "first Christian church." The Dura-Europos church in Syria is the oldest surviving church building in the world, while the archaeological remains of both the Aqaba Church and the Megiddo church have been considered to be the world's oldest known purpose-built church, erected in the Roman Empire's administrative Diocese of the East in the 3rd century. Several authors have cited the Etchmiadzin Cathedral (Armenia's mother church) as the oldest cathedral.

St. Thaddeus Monastery or Qara Kelisa (meaning 'black church') in Chaldoran County, Iran is also noted by UNESCO World Heritage Centre as related to the 66 AD: "According to Armenian tradition such a location was chosen because saint Thaddeus built the earliest church—parts of which are still believed to be in place as the base of the old section—upon the ruins of the temple." In the 66 AD, he as one of the Apostles and SanDokht (the daughter of the King or daughter of Abbot Simeon) and other Thaddeus' devotees were tortured and executed by Armenia's King Sanatrouk or Sanadruk.

Early Christianity
Church buildings of the 2nd to 4th centuries, either excavated archaeologically or substantially preserved.

Africa

Asia

Europe

Valkum (Fenekpuszta) Built before 433 AD remains of a Bazilika in Hungary near lake Balaton

Late Antiquity and Early Middle Ages

Church buildings dating to between the 5th and 10th centuries.

Africa

Asia

Europe

 The Dead Cities of Syria feature ruins of many churches, all abandoned prior to the 8th century and many dating from the 4th and 5th centuries
St. George's Church, Rihab, Jordan, 1st to 8th centuries. Dates are contested by experts but area under the church may have been used for Christian worship as early as AD 33.
 Church of Sts. Constantine and Helen, Yabroud, Syria, 5th century, Built from Roman temple; Desecrated in 2014 by extremists in Syrian Civil War
Al-Aqiser church, built in 500s, oldest church building in Iraq (foundations, some walls remain).
Saint Elijah's Monastery, near Mosul, Iraq is a 6th-century ruin and among the oldest monasteries in Iraq
 St. George's Church, Izra, Syria, Built in the 6th century
Saint Hripsime Church, built AD 618 in Armenia (Armenian Apostolic)
The Hanging Church, Built c. 690 on site of earlier church, possibly the oldest church building in Egypt  (Coptic Orthodox)
Ateni Sioni Church, early 7th century, Georgia
Anchiskhati Basilica, built in the 600s, the oldest church building in Tbilisi.
São Pedro de Balsemão, built in the 7th century, possibly oldest church building in Portugal (Roman Catholic).
Densuş Church, built in 600s, oldest church building in Romania
St Peter's Church, Monkwearmouth, UK, porch and west wall date from AD 674
St Paul's Church, Jarrow, UK, parts – including the original dedication stone – date from AD 685 
St Peter’s Church, Titchfield, Hampshire, UK, some parts remain from c. 680
St Laurence's Church, Bradford-on-Avon, Wiltshire, UK, Anglo-Saxon, could have been founded by St Aldhelm c. AD 700, although its style suggests 10th or 11th century. 
Great Church, Elst, Netherlands, church built in the 15th century, built upon and using the remains of two Gallo-Roman temples.
Gallarus Oratory, built between the 6th and 9th centuries, Possibly the oldest church building in Ireland
Church of Holy Cross, Nin, built in the 9th century, oldest church building in Croatia (Roman Catholic)
 Kadamattom Church, India, built in the 9th century.
 St. Mary's Forane Church, Kaduthuruthy, India, built in AD 500. Also known as Kaduthuruthy Valiya Palli
Church of Ayios Lazaros, Larnaca, built in the 9th century, one of the oldest churches in Cyprus
Church of SS. Peter and Paul, built at Budeč fortified settlement between 895 and 905 during rule of Spytihněv I is the oldest extant church building in the Czech Republic. The site (cf. :cs:Budeč (hradiště)) is located near village of Zákolany, about  NW of Prague.
Tkhaba-Yerdy Church, Russia, built prior to the 9th century
Greensted Church, UK, built in the mid-9th or mid-11th century, oldest wooden church building in Europe
Worth Church, UK, dated c. AD 950 to 1050.
Shoana Church, Russia, built c. the 10th century
Senty Church, Russia, built c. the 10th century
Church of Tarnaszentmária, built at the end of the 10th century
The Pantheon in Rome became a church in AD 608.

High to Late Middle Ages

A selection of notable, extant 11th- to 14th-century churches.

Christ Church Cathedral, Dublin, Ireland, built c. 1030
St. Margaret's Chapel, built in the 11th century, possibly the oldest church building in Scotland
Saviour Cathedral (Chernihiv), Ukraine, built in the 1030s
Saint Sophia Cathedral (Kyiv), Ukraine, built in the 1030s
Saint Cyril's Monastery (Kyiv), Ukraine, founded in 1140
Arkhyz churches, Russia, 10th to 13th centuries
Novgorod Cathedral, Russia, built between 1045 and 1050
Old Aker Church (Norwegian: Gamle Aker kirke) is a medieval church located in Oslo. An active parish, the church is the oldest existing building in Oslo from 1080.
Church of the Holy Sepulchre, rebuilt in 1089, in Jerusalem is venerated as Golgotha (the Hill of Calvary), where Jesus was crucified, and is said also to contain the place where Jesus was buried (the Sepulchre) (some walls from earlier structure may exist), (Greek Orthodox, Roman Catholic, Armenian Apostolic Orthodox, Syrian Orthodox, Coptic Orthodox, and Ethiopian Orthodox)
Church of St. Adalbert, Kraków, Kraków, Poland, built in the 11th century, possibly the oldest church building in Poland
Saint Sophia Cathedral in Polotsk, Belarus, 18th-century building with an 11th-century apse
Abbey of Romainmôtier: a 5th-century church was rebuilt in the 7th century, and again between 990 and 1030. The church building remained mostly unchanged since the 11th century, and qualifies as one of the oldest romanesque buildings in Switzerland.
Lund Cathedral, built in 1123, Possibly the oldest church in Sweden (although part of Denmark in 1123) (formerly Catholic, now Lutheran)
St. Mary's Cathedral, Limerick, Ireland, founded in 1168.
St. Peter's Church, Hamburg & St. Nicholas' Church, Hamburg, Hamburg, Germany, Building Started 1189 but were rebuilt several times due to fire & war but still stand in their original positions today.
St. Audoen's Church, Dublin, Ireland, founded in 1190.
St. Patrick's Cathedral, Dublin, Ireland, founded in 1191.
Church of Saint George, Lalibela, Ethiopia, Built in the 12th century, one of the oldest church buildings in Ethiopia (Ethiopian Orthodox Church)
Church of St. Panteleimon (Nerezi), built in the 12th century, One of the oldest church buildings in Macedonia
Kalozha Church, the oldest extant church building in Belarus, 12th century.
Church of Kish, one of the oldest extant churchs in Azerbaijan, 12th or 13th century.
Basilica of Saint Servatius, church congregation dating to 384 AD, current building built from 11th to 13th centuries, oldest congregation and possibly the oldest church building in the Netherlands (Roman Catholic)
Thiruvithamcode Arappally (Arappally means Royal Church) Kanyakumari District is the oldest Church building that still exists in India.
St. Canice's Cathedral, Kilkenny, Ireland, built between 1202 and 1285.
St. Nicholas Church, Vilnius, Lithuania, is the oldest surviving church in Lithuania. Originally built in the 14th century.
Hvalsey Church, located in Hvalsey (modern-day Qaqortoq), Greenland, Kingdom of Denmark, is the oldest surviving church (no longer in use, in ruins) in the Americas. Originally built in the 14th century as a Catholic church, although archaeology suggests it was constructed on the site of a previous church.
Trondenes Church, (Norwegian: Trondenes kirke) is the northernmost medieval stone church of Norway and the world's northernmost surviving medieval building. Finished and opened in 1435.

Early Modern

Notable early churches built in the New World between the 15th and 19th centuries. Listed are especially the oldest extant church buildings by country.

St. Francis Church, Kochi, India, built 1504–1516, oldest European church building in India (Church of South India)
 Church of Our lady of Light, Chennai, India built in 1516 by Portuguese(Roman Catholic).
Catedral de Santa María la Menor, commissioned by Pope Julius II in 1504, and built 1514–1540. It is the oldest standing church in the Americas and the oldest church building in the Dominican Republic (Roman Catholic)
St. Paul's Church, Malacca, Malaysia,  built in 1521 as a Roman Catholic chapel and finally abandoned in 1753. It is the oldest known church building in Malaysia
Cathedral of San Juan Bautista, Puerto Rico, built in 1521, oldest church building in the United States (Roman Catholic)
 Santhome Church, Chennai built in 1523 by Portuguese over the tomb of Saint Thomas the Apostle is a most important site for Christians in the world(Roman Catholic).
Chapel of Ermita del Rosario, Mexico, built in 1523, oldest chapel in Mexico
Santo Willibrordus Church, Indonesia, built in 1523, the oldest surviving church in Indonesia (Roman Catholic) 
The church of La Balbanera, Ecuador, was constructed in 1534, making it the oldest church constructed by the Spaniards in Ecuador
Chapel of San Jacinto, Guatemala, founded in 1524, one of the oldest churches in Guatemala (Roman Catholic)
Franciscan Chapel of the Red Cross, Jamaica, built in 1525, one of the oldest Spanish cathedrals in the New World (Roman Catholic)
St. Dominic's Church, Macau, China, built in 1527 by three Dominican Priests (Roman Catholic)
 Church of Saints Cosme and Damião, built in 1535, in the city of Igarassu, Pernambuco. Brazil's oldest church (Roman Catholic).
Cebu Metropolitan Cathedral, Cebu, Philippines established in 1565, previously named as the Church of St. Vitales and is the first church erected in the Philippines.(Roman Catholic)
Mexico City Metropolitan Cathedral, built 1574–1813, one of the oldest churches in Mexico (Roman Catholic)
Old West Kirk, Greenock, 1591, the first Protestant church built in Scotland post Reformation (Church of Scotland)
Cathedral of the Immaculate Conception in Beijing, founded in 1604, possibly the oldest continuous church congregation in China (Roman Catholic)
San Agustin Church, Manila, built in 1607, one of the oldest church buildings in the Philippines. (Roman Catholic)
First Jamestown Church (foundations), 1607, first Protestant church in what would become the USA (Episcopal)
San Miguel Mission, Santa Fe, New Mexico, USA, built in 1610, oldest church building in the continental U.S. (Roman Catholic)
Ruins of St. Paul's, China, built in 1627 (Roman Catholic)
St. James Church, Barbados, founded 1627, oldest congregation in Barbados (Anglican)
St. Columb's Cathedral, Derry, completed in 1633, first Protestant cathedral to be built in Europe
St. Luke's Church, USA, built in 1682 (Episcopal)
Jamestown Church (tower), (Episcopal)
Old Ship Church, USA, built in 1681 (Congregationalist, later Unitarian)
Notre-Dame-des-Victoires, Quebec City, built 1687–1723, later extensively rebuilt, Possibly the oldest church building in Canada (Roman Catholic)
Zion Church, Jakarta, Indonesia, the church was built in 1695, the oldest standing church structure in the city.
Cathedral of San Fernando, San Antonio, Texas, USA, built between 1738 and 1750, the oldest cathedral sanctuary in the United States
St. Paul's Church (Halifax), built 1750, Possibly the oldest Protestant church building in Canada (Anglican)
Blenduk Church, built in 1753 complete with a Baroque Organ from the 18th century, it is the oldest church in Central Java, Indonesia.
Christ Church Melaka, built in 1753 as a Dutch Reformed church, it now houses an Anglican congregation. It is the oldest Protestant church building in Malaysia
Mission San Diego de Alcalá, built in 1769 by Junipero Serra, is a functioning Roman Catholic church and the oldest in California (United States).  It sits at the base of El Camino Real, the road going northward in California that is punctuated by missions about a day's walk apart.
St. Anne's Church, constructed by the Portuguese in 1792, built in European and Gothic styles, one of the oldest Churches in South India, in Virajpet, Coorg. 
Her Majesty's Royal Chapel of the Mohawks, constructed in 1785 for the Mohawk people led by Joseph Brant, first Protestant church in Upper Canada (Anglican)
Church of the Holy Ascension, USA, built in 1826, oldest church building in Alaska (Russian Orthodox)
Armenian Church, Singapore, built 1835, oldest church in Singapore
Mokuaikaua Church, USA, built in 1837, oldest church congregation and building in Hawaii (Congregational)
Christ Church Royal Chapel, established in 1784, built in 1843 by the Mohawk people to symbolise their alliance with the British Crown (Anglican)
Saigon Notre-Dame Basilica, Possibly oldest church building in Vietnam, built 1863–1880 (Roman Catholic)
Ōura Church, built in 1864, Possibly the oldest church building in Japan (Roman Catholic)
Wanchin Basilica of the Immaculate Conception, Taiwan, built in 1870,  oldest chapel in Taiwan (Roman Catholic)
Myeongdong Cathedral, built between 1892–1898, Oldest church building in South Korea (Roman Catholic)
Living Water Church, built 1909, One of the Oldest Pentecostal Church buildings in the World. Built 3 years after Azusa St. Revival in San Francisco, 1906 (Charismatic Church)

See also 
 Church architecture
 Church (building)
 List of the oldest buildings in the world

References

External links 
 International Architecture database

Churches, oldest
Churches, oldest
Churches
Oldest
Churches, oldest
Oldest
Churches, oldest
Churches, oldest
Oldest things